Matthew Edwin Carpenter (born July 20, 1964) is an American Ultramarathoner as a trail runner and in high altitude marathons.

Early life
Carpenter was born in North Carolina, before moving to Kentucky and then Mississippi while in high school. He took up running while living there, because he had "nothing else to do". Over time it became a way to fund his college education, and subsequently an escape from bereavement in the period following the death of his mother.

As a student at the University of Southern Mississippi he frequently visited Colorado, and moved there after graduation, first to Vail in 1987, then to Colorado Springs four years later, before settling in Manitou Springs in 1998.

Physiology
In 1990, his VO2 max, a measure of the body's ability to intake oxygen, was calculated to be 90.2 during tests at the U.S. Olympic Training Center, the highest they had recorded. This, and his rigorous training regime—he claims to have run daily for over five years between 1997 and his daughter's birth in 2002—are credited as the keys to his enduring success.

Endorsement & dominance

Later in his career he moved to ultrarunning, and sustained his previous success, setting course records in the San Juan Solstice 50-mile race in Lake City, Colorado in 2004, and breaking the record for the Leadville Trail 100 race in 2005 by over an hour and a half.

Carpenter has won the Pikes Peak Marathon on twelve occasions, the Vail Hill Climb eight times, the Imogene Pass Run six times, the Barr Trail Mountain Race, Everest SkyMarathon Tibet, and Aspen SkyMarathon five times each, and holds the course record for all of these events. He is also the record holder for running the fastest flat marathons run at altitude at both 14,000 and 17,000 feet. His success in the sport has been so extensive and dominant that he has been compared to Lance Armstrong, and described as "one of the greatest mountain runners of all time".

Carpenter's greatest dominance has been on Pikes Peak. He has won eighteen races; six ascents and twelve marathons, including an unprecedented double, winning both on consecutive days in 2001. On the ascent he holds the age group record for both 40- to 44-year-olds, and 25- to 29-year-olds, the latter the outright record with a time of 2:01:06, set during the 1993 marathon. In the marathon itself, he holds the record for the 20- to 24-, 25- to 29-, 35- to 39- and 40- to 44-year-old age groups, as well as the outright fastest time of 3:16:39, also in 1993.

In October 2013, Carpenter was the first distance runner inducted into the Colorado Springs Sports Hall of Fame.

Later life
He currently lives with his Brazilian-born wife Yvonne and their daughter Kyla, born in 2002. The couple are both members of the Incline Club, their local trail-running group, and are so dedicated to their sport that their wedding was held during a Sunday morning training run along the Waldo Canyon Trail in February 2000.

Since 2012, Carpenter and his wife own and operate the Colorado Custard Company, a small shop in Manitou Springs, Colorado.

References

1964 births
Living people
American male ultramarathon runners
Sportspeople from Asheville, North Carolina
University of Southern Mississippi alumni
People from Manitou Springs, Colorado
American sky runners
World Long Distance Mountain Running Championships winners